Dierks Lake is a reservoir  down the Saline River, and  from Dierks, Arkansas.

Construction 

The Flood Control Act approved July 3, 1958 authorized Dierks Dam for construction. The project was designed by the Tulsa District of the United States Army Corps of Engineers and constructed under their supervision. Construction of the project was started in June 1968 and embankment closure was made in May 1975.  The dam is an earthen structure 48 feet high.

Purpose 

The purposes of Dierks Lake are: flood control on the Saline River, recreation, water supply, and fish and wildlife conservation. As a part of the Little River Basin System the lake offers a high degree of flood protection to large areas of land both in the Little River Basin and the flood plain along the Red River.

Recreation on the lake is very popular. The  lake provides and enjoyable experience for the boating enthusiast. Dierks Lake is known for its wonderful bass and crappie fishing. It is also a great place for swimming and skiing. Fishing provides many hours of enjoyment for the visitors at Dierks Lake. The species most actively sought are: smallmouth bass, largemouth bass, spotted bass, crappie, channel catfish, flathead catfish, and the various species of sunfish. Most of the species found in the lake are also found in the downstream area. Picnicking areas are available at many of the sites on Dierks Lake. There are 4 reservable picnic areas, which are great for family reunions or holidays. The picnic shelters are lighted and equipped with barbecue grills and electricity. These shelters are located at Jefferson Ridge, Horseshoe Bend, and Dierks Overlook.

See also 
List of Arkansas dams and reservoirs

Sources
http://webarchive.loc.gov/all/20090620214703/http://www.swl.usace.army.mil/parks/dierks/damandlake.htm
http://webarchive.loc.gov/all/20090620214748/http://www.swl.usace.army.mil/parks/dierks/recreation.htm

Protected areas of Howard County, Arkansas
Lakes of the U.S. Interior Highlands
Reservoirs in Arkansas
Protected areas of Sevier County, Arkansas
Buildings and structures in Howard County, Arkansas
Buildings and structures in Sevier County, Arkansas
Dams in Arkansas
United States Army Corps of Engineers dams
Bodies of water of Howard County, Arkansas
Bodies of water of Sevier County, Arkansas
1975 establishments in Arkansas